Shanghai Knights is a 2003 American martial arts action comedy film. It is the sequel to Shanghai Noon, and the second installment of the Shanghai film series. Directed by David Dobkin and written by Alfred Gough and Miles Millar, it stars Jackie Chan, Owen Wilson, Fann Wong, Donnie Yen and Aidan Gillen.

It was released on February 7, 2003. The film received mixed reviews but it performed well at the box office.

Plot
In 1887, Lord Nelson Rathbone leads a band of Boxers into the Forbidden City, killing the Keeper of the Imperial Seal of China and stealing the seal. With his dying breath, the Keeper gives his daughter, Chon Lin, a puzzle box for her brother, Sheriff Chon Wang.

In Carson City, Nevada, Wang has captured an impressive array of fugitives. Wang receives the box and a letter from Lin telling him of their father's death and that she has tracked the murderer to London.

Wang travels to New York City to find his old partner Roy O'Bannon and collect his share of their gold so that he can buy passage to London. Roy has left law enforcement, broken off his marriage, invested all their gold in the Zeppelin, and is now a waiter and part-time gigolo. After an aborted attempt at prostitution to pay for tickets, the pair ship themselves to London in a crate.

In London, Roy's pocket is picked by a youth named Charlie. After a struggle between Roy, Wang, Charlie, and a gang angered by Charlie stealing on their turf, they are arrested. In Scotland Yard, Inspector Artie Doyle thanks the two for defeating the Fleet Street gang. When they ask about Lin, Artie shows them she is in custody, having attempted to kill Lord Rathbone. Roy is instantly smitten with Lin and gives her a deck of playing cards as a good luck charm. Wang and Roy encounter Charlie. Breaking into an estate for shelter, they find an invitation to a gala at Buckingham Palace.

Roy and Wang infiltrate the gala in disguise: Roy as Major General "Sherlock Holmes" (a name he derives from the face of a clock) and Wang as the "Maharaja of Nevada". Wang and Roy follow Rathbone to a private library, where he slips through a secret passage. Wang finds the seal box, but the seal itself is gone and they are attacked by guards. Lin, having used Roy's playing cards to pick the lock on her cell, arrives and saves Roy. The three see Rathbone give the Imperial Seal to Wu Chow, the illegitimate brother of the Emperor of China. After a brief struggle, Charlie steals the seal. Rathbone and Wu Chow escape after the former sets the barn that they were in on fire. Lin manages to escape, with Roy and Wang stealing Rathbone's car, later crashing it into Stonehenge. Rathbone fires Artie after suggesting that his "incompetence knows no bounds". Wang and Roy are picked up by Lin the next morning who takes them to Whitechapel.

At a brothel, Roy overhears Wang try to convince Lin that Roy is an unsuitable husband, even telling her of his gigolo history and suspected infertility. Wang soothes Roy's feelings of betrayal by treating him to a pillow fight with the brothel staff. Wang, Roy, and Lin are found and captured by Rathbone, who reveals his plan: In exchange for the seal, Wu Chow will kill the British royal family and frame Lin. As tenth in line for the throne, Rathbone will then become king. Awaiting death, Roy confesses he spent most of the fortune publishing novels such as Roy O'Bannon Vs. The Mummy, in which he portrayed himself as a hero and Wang as a cowardly sidekick. The two are reconciled and Wang says he will not stand between him and Lin. He frees himself and saves Roy.

Wong and Roy consult Artie about Charlie's location. Artie deduces from a hat he dropped that Charlie is at Madame Tussauds. They save him from the Boxers but lose the seal after the three are forced to hand it over to the Boxers, in exchange for Charlie's life. The three are then captured by police. Charlie rescues them and reveals his full name is Charlie Chaplin. They save the royal family from being assassinated by Wu Chow, whom Lin kills with a rocket. The three pursue Rathbone to the top of Big Ben. Roy is thrown off but hangs onto the clock face, while Wang is hopelessly outmatched at swordplay by Rathbone, who repeatedly spares his life so as to prolong their duel. Wang gives up on trying to outright defeat Rathbone, instead severing the support ropes for their platform. Roy catches Wang as Rathbone falls to his death. Both soon jump after grabbing a portion of the Union Jack landing safely inside the Queen's coach.

Roy, Wang, and Artie are knighted. Artie decides to write stories, and asks Roy for use of the "Sherlock Holmes" name. Wang opens the box his father sent him to find a message reminding him of the importance of family. Roy proposes that he and Wang go to Hollywood to join the new motion picture industry. Charlie stows away as they drive off.

Cast

 Jackie Chan as Chon Wang
 Owen Wilson as Roy O'Bannon
 Fann Wong as Chon Lin
 Aaron Johnson as Charlie Chaplin
 Tom Fisher as Arthur "Artie" Doyle
 Donnie Yen as Wu Chow
 Aidan Gillen as Lord Nelson Rathbone
 Oliver Cotton as Jack the Ripper
 Kim Chan as Chon Wang and Chon Lin's Father
 Gemma Jones as Queen Victoria
 Tom Wu as "Lead Boxer" Liu
 Kelly-Marie Kerr as Clara
 Constantine Gregory as the Mayor of New York City
 Ray Donn as Chinese villager (uncredited)
 Barbara Nedeljáková as Debutante
 Anna-Louise Plowman as Debutante
 Georgina Chapman as Debutante
 Daisy Beaumont as Cigarette girl
 Alison King as Prostitute
 Matt Hill as Deputy
 Barry Stanton as Lord Chancellor

Jackie Chan Stunt Team
 Brad Allan as Street thug / Library thug (uncredited)
 Paul Andreovski as Library thug with sword (double) / English policeman (uncredited)
 Nicky Li
 He Jun
 Wu Gang
 Park Hyun Jin
 Lee In Seob
 Han Guan Hua

Production

Director David Dobkin was personally chosen by Jackie Chan. Dobkin had a difficult time choosing a suitable Asian actress who could do movement work, emote well and speak excellent English. He then saw clips of Fann Wong's videos "Wo lai ye" (2001) and "Qing she yu bai she" (2001) and asked to audition her in London, which she did. She got the role and the number of scenes with her in was increased by thirty percent. On Jackie Chan's memoir Never Grow Up, Faye Wong from his native city Hong Kong was his first choice but Fann Wong was incorrectly hired.

Aside from establishing shots of iconic English landmarks, including The House of Lords, Buckingham Palace and Madame Tussaud's, the scenes in London were largely filmed in Prague, Czech Republic from February 4 to June 21, 2002.

Reception

Critical response
The film received mixed reviews from critics, with praise for the chemistry between Chan and Wilson, the action sequences, and the fun nature of the film, but strong criticism for the plot.

On Rotten Tomatoes the film has an approval rating of 66% based on 151 reviews. The site's consensus states: "A silly, anachronistic mess, but the pairing of Chan and Wilson makes the movie fun."

On Metacritic the film has a score of 58 out of 100, based on reviews from 33 critics. Audiences surveyed by CinemaScore gave the film a grade "B+" on scale of A to F.

Roger Ebert of the Chicago Sun Times gave the film 3 out of 4 stars, calling it "fun in a broad, genial way", but disapproved of the "entirely arbitrary" plot.
Joe Leydon of Variety found it better than its predecessor: "A hugely entertaining and more lavishly mounted follow-up to 2000's Shanghai Noon, the high-concept East-meets-Western  that first teamed [the] top-billed duo  pic rides even taller in the saddle as a fleet and funny crowd-pleaser." Elvis Mitchell of The New York Times gave a positive review,  singling out Chan's fight sequences and Wilson's performance, noting how "Wilson gets to steal a part of the movie that Chan is smart enough not to want." Mitchell also praised the "bluntly gorgeous" cinematography, and said Chan's reputation is "resuscitated in the rousing, cheerful sequel", calling it "one of his best." Nathan Rabin of The A.V. Club also praised the chemistry between the two leads, writing, "Chan [...] found the perfect screen buddy in Wilson." Rabin criticized the "thin" plot, but found "there's a greatest-hits element" to Chan's fight scenes.

Planned sequel

A third film was meant to be produced under the title Shanghai Dawn. Plans for the film were posted on Jackie Chan's website, but after some news of casting and production plans, no film has been produced. While unconfirmed, it is speculated that the project has been halted indefinitely as there is no news nor a release date. In a February 7, 2003, interview, Owen Wilson said: "We're talking about it maybe starting in Hollywood and then going from there to Africa or the Pyramids ... I feel like we have the freedom to take them anywhere in time we want."

MGM announced in May 2015 that they were moving forward with Shanghai Dawn. Jackie Chan, Owen Wilson and Fann Wong are expected to reprise their roles as Chon Wang, Roy O'Bannon and Chon Lin respectively. In September 2016, Jared Hess signed on as director for the film while both Millar and Gough would develop a screen story with Theodore Riley and Aaron Buchsbaum writing the script for the film.

Gough said the third film will be set in China because Chan "wants to showcase China in the way that the first film showcased the old West". Gough added that Chan and Wilson also have a hand in the creative process: "With those films, the collaboration of Jackie and Owen comes out on screen as they get along very well. With that in mind, you want to get their input in the story phase, so that when we got to script, it's based into the DNA of the story." As of 2023, there is no further information or release date for the film.

References

External links

 
 
 

2000s martial arts comedy films
2003 films
2003 action comedy films
2000s buddy comedy films
American action adventure films
American action comedy films
American buddy comedy films
American sequel films
Cultural depictions of Arthur Conan Doyle
Cultural depictions of Charlie Chaplin
Cultural depictions of Jack the Ripper
Cultural depictions of Queen Victoria on film
Fictional duos
Films directed by David Dobkin
Films produced by Roger Birnbaum
Films set in 1887
Films set in Beijing
Films set in China
Films set in England
Films set in Hong Kong
Films set in London
Films set in Nevada
Films set in New York City
Films set in the Victorian era
Films shot in the Czech Republic
Hong Kong action comedy films
Hong Kong buddy films
Hong Kong sequel films
Spyglass Entertainment films
Touchstone Pictures films
Films scored by Randy Edelman
2003 martial arts films
Shanghai (film series)
2003 comedy films
2000s English-language films
2000s American films
2000s Hong Kong films